= Neupulse =

Peripheral Nerve Stimulator for Tourette syndrome

Neupulse is a watch device designed to help people with Tourette syndrome, reducing their tics.
